Sergio Felipe Román Palacios (born 21 May 1995) is a Colombian professional footballer who plays for Once Caldas.

Career

References

1995 births
Living people
Colombian footballers
Association football goalkeepers
Once Caldas footballers
Categoría Primera A players
People from Manizales